Robert Keers (October 25, 1984 - July 5, 2020) was a British psychologist conducting innovative research on individual differences in mental health problems with a specific focus on psychiatric genetics.

Biography 
Born in Aylesbury (Buckinghamshire, UK), Rob Keers grew up in Berkhamsted and Tring (Hertfordshire, UK). He completed a BSc in Genetics and Psychology at the University of Liverpool (2003-2006) whilst also spending several months working as a nursing assistant at the Eric Shepherd Unit in Abbots Langley (2005-2006) where he was involved in the care of men with learning disabilities. He then moved to the Institute of Psychiatry, Psychology and Neuroscience at King’s College London for a MSc and PhD in Social, Genetic, and Developmental Psychiatry (2007-2011). After completing his PhD which investigated the effects of genes, environments and their interaction on depression and response to treatment, he took up a research fellow post at Queen Mary University of London looking at the effects of treatment on violent outcomes in psychosis (2010-2012). He was then awarded an MRC population health scientist fellowship for his own three-year project entitled “Translating gene-environment interaction from aetiology to personalised medicine for anxiety and depression” based at King’s College London (2013-2016). In 2016 he joined the Department of Biological and Experimental Psychology at Queen Mary University of London as Lecturer (Assistant Professor).

Honors and awards
 Wellcome Trust Seed Award (2017)
 Population Health Fellowship from the UK Medical Research Council (2013)
 10th Annual Pharmacogenetics in Psychiatry Meeting Travel Award (2011)
 Young Scientist Award, European College of Neuropsychopharmacology (2010)
 XVII World Congress of Psychiatric Genetics Travel Award (2009)
 PhD Studentship from the UK Medical Research Council (2007)

Research 
Rob Keers’ research focussed on identifying genetic and environmental factors associated with the development of psychiatric disorders and response to treatment. He has led and collaborated on a number of projects which addressed this broad aim including human pharmacogenomics, gene-environment interactions, circadian rhythms and behavioural pharmacology. As part of his PhD Rob Keers investigated the effects of genes, environments and their interaction on depression and response to treatment, followed by postdoctoral research on the effects of treatment on violent outcomes in psychosis. He then received his own funding to investigate whether the same genes that moderate the effects of the environment on the development of anxiety and depression may also be important predictors of response to Cognitive Behavioural Therapy (CBT). This work resulted in the creation of a polygenic score for sensitivity to the environment that he found to moderate the effects of both parenting quality and psychological therapy. Specifically, he showed that genetically more sensitive children were more negatively affected by low quality parenting but also benefited more from high quality parenting. He also showed that genetically more sensitive children benefited more from intensive one-to-one CBT with a therapist whereas they did less well when they received a brief parent-led form of CBT. This genome-wide polygenic score for sensitivity has been adopted by several other researchers and shown to predict the response to psychological treatment in children  as well as adults. A Wellcome Trust funded follow-up project titled “Investigating a novel approach to gene-environment interaction in depression and anxiety”, allowed him to revise and strengthen the initial polygenic scores by drawing on data from multiple twin studies with genome-wide data. Besides his influential research in psychiatric genetics, he also developed a Masters course titled MSc Psychology: Mental Health Sciences at Queen Mary University of London.

Personal life
Rob Keers was married to Kate Keers. Together they had one daughter.

Important Related Concepts 

 Candidate gene
 Diathesis-stress model
 Differential susceptibility hypothesis
 Environmental sensitivity
 Gene-environment interaction
 Genome-wide association study
 Sensory processing sensitivity

References

External links
 Official website at Queen Mary University of London
 Official tribute at Queen Mary University of London
 Official website at researchgate
 Official website at sensitivityresearch*

Academics of King's College London
Academics of Queen Mary University of London
British psychologists
Behavior geneticists
Psychiatric geneticists
1984 births
2020 deaths